52 Hydrae is a triple star system in the constellation Hydra. It has the Bayer designation l Hydrae; 52 Hydrae is the Flamsteed designation. This system is visible to the naked eye as a faint, blue-white hued star with an apparent visual magnitude of 4.97. It is a probable (80% chance) member of the Sco OB2 moving group of stars, and is moving away from the Earth with a heliocentric radial velocity of 5 km/s.

It shows a combined stellar classification of B7/8V, which matches a B-type main-sequence star.

References

B-type main-sequence stars
Triple stars
Hydra (constellation)
Hydrae, l
Durchmusterung objects
Hydrae, 52
126769
070753
5407